The  is a  railway tunnel that is under construction in southern Hokkaido. It will link the city of Hokuto with the town of Yakumo.

The Oshima Tunnel will be a part of the Hokkaido Shinkansen, located between its current northern terminus at Shin-Hakodate-Hokuto Station and the planned Shin-Yakumo Station. Drilling began in 2016 and is set to finish in 2024. Upon its completion it will surpass the Hakkōda Tunnel in Aomori Prefecture as the longest terrestrial tunnel in Japan.

References

Railway tunnels in Japan
Hokkaido Shinkansen
Buildings and structures in Hokkaido
Transport in Hokkaido